David Murphy (June 23, 1921–August 28, 2014) was the Central Intelligence Agency's station chief in Berlin from 1959 to 1961. In that position, he advised John F. Kennedy on how to react to the construction of the Berlin Wall. Subsequently, he became chief of the CIA's Soviet Russia operation  division.

In 1997, he and his counterpart, former KGB Berlin Chief Sergei Kondrashev, co-wrote Battleground Berlin, a memoir of the Cold War.

References

External links
Log of online moderated chat with David Murphy at CNN
David Murphy interviewed at Agentura.Ru

People of the Central Intelligence Agency
1921 births
2014 deaths
American expatriates in Germany